Gear4music is a British online retailer of musical instruments and musical equipment. The company's headquarters is in Clifton Moor, York, England, with distribution centres in Germany, Spain, Sweden, and Ireland.

History
The company was founded in 1995 by recording engineer Andrew Wass, originally supplying equipment to small recording studios.

In March 2012 the private equity firm Key Capital Partners (KCP) bought a £3.4 million minority stake in the group to develop its e-commerce platform. The company saw its sales turnover rise from £12.3 million in the year to February 2013, to £24.2 million in February 2015.

Gear4music completed an initial public offering (IPO) in June 2015, listing on the Alternative Investment Market (AIM) in London, with KCP retaining a 24 per cent stake. In 2013 the company moved to its distribution centre in York. 

The company subsequently opened distribution centres in Mülheim, Germany, Barcelona, Spain, Rosersberg, Sweden, and Dublin, Ireland.

In December 2021 the company completed the acquisition of AV Distribution Ltd, a retailer of audio-visual equipment, including hi-fi speakers, home cinema systems and specialist furniture. The company reported a drop in sales over the summer of 2022, partly attributed to the 2022 United Kingdom heat waves, which meant people spent more time outdoors. From the period April to September, they reported a pre-tax loss of £1 million, whereas in the same period the year before, they reported nearly £2 million in profit.

References

External links
Retail website
Corporate website

Companies based in York
Retail companies of England
Musical instrument retailers
Retail companies established in 1995
British companies established in 1995